This article uses national romanization of Ukrainian.

Vasyl Lazoryshynets (Vasyl Vasylovych Lazoryshynets) is a Ukrainian cardiac surgeon, director of the Mykola Amosov National Institute of Cardiovascular Surgery of the National Academy of Medical Sciences of Ukraine.

Biography 
 In 1974 he graduated from Sokyrnytsia School with a gold medal
 In 1980 he graduated from the Kyiv Medical Institute. O.O. Bogomolets, (now the National Medical University named after O.O. Bogomolets, program subject area "General medicine"
 1980-1982 - Doctor of the pathological department of the Chernihiv Regional Hospital
 1984-1987 - Surgeon, vascular surgeon of Chernihiv Regional Hospital
 1987-1989 - Clinical resident in the specialty "Cardiac Surgery" of the Kyiv Research Institute of Cardiovascular Surgery (now the Amosov National institute of cardiovascular surgery)
 1989-1992 - Junior Research Fellow, Department of Congenital Heart Diseases, Kyiv Research Institute of Cardiovascular Surgery
 1992-2003 - Head of the Department of Congenital Heart Disease Surgery in Children of the Institute of Cardiovascular Surgery of the Academy of Medical Sciences of Ukraine
 March - June 2003 - Deputy Director of Medical Work of the Institute of Cardiovascular Surgery of the Academy of Medical Sciences of Ukraine
 2003-2004 - Deputy Director of Research work at the Institute of Cardiovascular Surgery of the Academy of Medical Sciences of Ukraine
 2004-2008 - National Academy of Medical Sciences of Ukraine. Head of the medical and organizational department
 2008-2009 - Deputy Ministry of Healthcare (Ukraine)
 2009-2010 - First Deputy Ministry of Healthcare (Ukraine)
 2010 - Elected Corresponding Member of the National Academy of Medical Sciences of Ukraine
 2010 -2014 - Head of the medical and organizational department of the National Academy of Medical Sciences of Ukraine
 April 16 - October 1, 2014 - Deputy Minister of Ministry of Healthcare (Ukraine) - Head of Staff
 October 1, 2014 - December 2, 2014 - Acting Ministry of Healthcare (Ukraine)
 December 2 - December 24 - First Deputy Ministry of Healthcare (Ukraine)
 2015 - Head of the medical and organizational department of the National Academy of Medical Sciences of Ukraine
 November 1, 2015 - appointed Acting Director of the National Institute of Cardiovascular Surgery. M.M. Amosov
 January 19, 2016 - elected director of the National Institute of Cardiovascular Surgery. M.M. Amosov
 May 2016 - elected academician of the National Academy of Medical Sciences of Ukraine

Research activities
 1995 - Candidate of Sciences
 2002 - Medical doctor 
 2003 - Professor
 2010 - Corresponding Member of the Academy of Medical Sciences of Ukraine
 2017 - Academician. National Academy of Medical Sciences of Ukraine
 Active member of the European Association for Cardio-Thoracic Surgery            
 Member of the French Association of Thoracic and Cardiovascular Surgeons
 Member of the American Association for Thoracic Surgery
 Founder and member of the World Association of Pediatric Cardiologists and Cardiac Surgeons
 Head of the Association of Cardiovascular Surgeons of Ukraine 
 Head of the Specialized Academic Council for the Defense of Dissertations in the specialty 14.01.04 "Cardiovascular Surgery"
Author of more than 380 scientific papers, 13 monographs, 36 copyright certificates, and 4 guidelines. As a supervisor, he prepared 10 candidates of medical sciences. In 2019 he is the research supervisor of 4 doctoral and 5 candidate dissertations

Social activities
 Co-founder of the Healthy Heart Initiative 
 Head of the Board of the Association of Cardiovascular Surgeons of Ukraine
 Deputy Chairman of the Board "ALL-UKRAINIAN ASSOCIATION OF CHIEF DOCTORS" 
 President of the "CITIZENS 'ASSOCIATION" SOCIETY OF Zakarpatsiv IN KYIV"

Family 
Married. Wife: Lazoryshynets Tetyana. He has two daughters.

Awards 
 Order of Prince Yaroslav the Wise. (May 18, 2017 - 4th Degree., June 11, 2007 - 5th Degree.) - for a significant personal contribution to the development of domestic science, strengthening the scientific and technical potential of Ukraine, many years of hard work and high professionalism 
 Honored Medic of Ukraine (June 19, 1999) - for merits in the development of health care, the introduction of new methods of diagnosis and treatment, high professionalism
 State Prize of Ukraine in the field of science and technology in 2005 - for fundamental research on the impact of  hyperthermia on the state of immunity and the development of new highly effective treatment technologies for purulent-septic diseases in cardiovascular and abdominal surgery (as part of the team)
 Prize of the Cabinet of Ministers of Ukraine for the development and implementation of innovative technologies in 2016 - for the work "Innovative approach to the organization and provision of medical care in hybrid warfare" (as part of the team) 
 Laureate of the State Prize of Ukraine in the field of education (2018)

References

External links 
 Cabinet of Ukraine
 NATIONAL INSTITUTE OF CARDIOVASCULAR SURGERY
 Vasyl Lazoryshynets in Facebook
 profile Vasyl Lazoryshynets's on website National Akademy of medical sciences of Ukraine
 profile Vasyl Lazoryshynets's on website Shupyk National Medical Academy of Postgraduate Education
 profile Vasyl Lazoryshynets's on Bibliography by Google
 profile Vasyl Lazoryshynets's on CTSNet.org (Connect the global cardiothoracic community)
 Український медичний часопис про підтримку медичною спільнотою кандидатури В.В. Лазоришиня на посаду Міністра охорони здоров'я
 Coronavirus & impact of the disease on heart. Vasyl Lazoryshynets. nterview for the  Nova Doba newspaper
 Academician Vasyl Lazoryshynets: "It is not an exaggeration to assert that without science there can be no sustainable development Healthcare" Voice of Ukraine newspaper
 Vasyl Lazoryshynets assures our hospitals have reserves for rehabilitation of wounded in ATO soldiers. web-site of Cabinet of Ministers of Ukraine 

Living people
Ukrainian cardiac surgeons
People from Zakarpattia Oblast
1957 births
Recipients of the Order of Prince Yaroslav the Wise, 3rd class
Recipients of the Order of Prince Yaroslav the Wise, 4th class
Laureates of the State Prize of Ukraine in the field of education
Laureates of the State Prize of Ukraine in Science and Technology